The Battle of Khakeekera was a naval battle that took place in March 1811 between the forces of Bahrain (led by Abdullah bin Ahmad Al Khalifa) and of Kuwait (led by Jaber I Al-Sabah) on one side, and those of the Emirate of Diriyah (or First Saudi State) led by Rahmah ibn Jabir al-Jalhami, the pirate ruler of Dammam and some villages in Qatar, on the other. The battle took place northwest of Qatar and ended with a Bahraini-Kuwaiti victory.

Background
King Saud bin Abdulaziz bin Muhammad bin Saud wrote to Ibn Jabir, ordering him to prepare an invasion in retaliation for the House of Khalifa renouncing Saudi suzerainty. To this end, the king sent his vassal troops from Najd, Al-Ahsa, and Qatif and a fleet of 60 ships. Learning of this, Al Khalifa asked for aid from Al Sabah to repel the invasion.

Battle
Ibn Jabir noticed the reinforcements were inadequate to the task and wanted to withdraw, but he was prevented from doing so by Ibn Afisan, the former Saudi governor and titular Emir of Bahrain. Therefore, Ibn Jabir's fleet proceeded to Al Khuwayr, where they were captured despite killing 1,000 Bahraini and Kuwaiti soldiers, including officers Duaij bin Sabah Al Sabah and Rashid bin Abdullah bin Ahmed Al Khalifa. Ibn Jabir lost 300 troops and was forced to withdraw to defend Diriyah from Ottoman armies invading the western Hejaz from Yanbu on the Red Sea.

Ship burning
Uthman ibn Bishr, the chief historian of the early Wahhabi movement, writes as follows in his 1853 book Unwān al-majd fī ta'rīkh Najd ("The Name of Glory in the History of the Najd"), written around 1853 to 1854 but first published in 1873:

Some of each side’s ships encountered one another at sea near Bahrain in the month of Rabiʽ al-Awwal. In the battle, more than a thousand men were killed among the people of Bahrain and their followers, including Duaij bin Sabah, the ruler of Kuwait, as well as Rashid bin Abdullah bin Hamad Al Khalifa and other nobles.

References

History of Kuwait
19th century in Bahrain
History of Nejd
History of Qatar
Khakeekera
Khakeekera
Khakeekera
Khakeekera
Khakeekera